George Mihail Vlădescu (March 2, 1885–March 29, 1952) was a Romanian prose writer.

Born in Cotești, Vrancea County, his parents were Mihai Vlădescu, a clerk, and his wife Elena (née Fleva). He had a high-school education, and worked as a clerk, an army officer and a farmer. His first published work appeared in Sentinela in 1903; his first book was the 1915 short story collection Lacrimi adevărate. Publications in which his output appeared include Convorbiri critice, Ramuri, Năzuința, Cosânzeana and Gândirea. He sometimes used the pen names g.m.vl., G.M.VL., O.B., Mihail Corbea, Odo Basca, Mihail-Vlădescu and G. M. Vlădescu-Vlad. He published translations, including of Fyodor Dostoyevsky and Mark Twain. Vlădescu authored several novels (Menuetul, 1933; Moartea fratelui meu, 1934; Republica disperaților, 1935; Gol, 1937) and short story collections (Tăcere, 1923; Plecarea Magdalenei, 1936). He wrote in a flowing style marked by philosophizing metaphors, ably describing provincial life. His humanist themes are developed through a sentimental narration that alternates melodrama with satirical caricatures. Menuetul won the Romanian Writers' Society prize in 1933; Moartea fratelui meu was awarded the Femina Prize the following year. He died in Dumitrești, near his birthplace.

Notes

1885 births
1952 deaths
People from Vrancea County
Romanian male short story writers
Romanian short story writers
Romanian novelists
Romanian translators
Romanian Land Forces officers
20th-century translators